The Serie B 1957–58 was the twenty-sixth tournament of this competition played in Italy since its creation.

Teams
Prato and Lecco had been promoted from Serie C, while Triestina and Palermo had been relegated from Serie A.

Events
Relegations were cancelled in March by new Football League’s chairman Giuseppe Pasquale in order to expand the number of participants from 18 to 20.
Moreover, Bari, the second ranked team, had to play a qualification match with Verona, that ranked 17th in 1957–58 Serie A.

Final classification

Results

Serie A qualification play-off
Bari had to play a qualification match against the team that ranked 17th in Serie A.

Bari promoted to Serie A.

References and sources
Almanacco Illustrato del Calcio - La Storia 1898-2004, Panini Edizioni, Modena, September 2005

Serie B seasons
2
Italy